Jung Soo-bin (Hangul: 정수빈; born October 7, 1990) is a South Korean outfielder for the Doosan Bears of the KBO League. He bats and throws left-handed.

Amateur career
While attending Yu-shin High School in Suwon, Gyeonggi-do, Jung was a highly regarded hitting pitcher, occupying the No. 1 spot in the starting rotation and the leadoff spot in the batting order upon entering the school.

In , his sophomore year of high school, he help his team advance into the semifinals at the 59th Hwarang Flag National High School Baseball Championship, racking up two wins as a starting pitcher.

In , Jung was selected for the South Korea national junior baseball team to compete at the 2008 World Junior Baseball Championship, where they claimed their fifth tournament title. He was named to the All-Tournament  team alongside fellow hitter Oh Ji-hwan, batting .423 (11-for-26) with 2 RBIs and 4 runs in 9 games as the starting center fielder of the team.

Notable international careers

Professional career
Drafted by the Doosan Bears in the second round (39th pick, 47th overall) of the  KBO Draft, Jung became the youngest position player in franchise history to be named to the Bears' Opening Day 26-man roster since Jung Soo-Keun in the 1995 season. He made his pro league debut on April 5, 2009, as a pinch runner against the Kia Tigers. On April 22, Jung hit a game-winning two-run home run, which was his first professional home run, against the SK Wyverns in the top of the 12th inning. He finished his rookie season with a respectable .264 batting average, 3 home runs, 17 RBI and 13 stolen bases in 85 games.

In , Jung played in 76 games as a backup outfielder. He batted .322 in 143 at-bats with 19 RBI, and stole 13 bases. After the 2010 season, Jung was selected for the South Korea national baseball team to compete in the Intercontinental Cup held in Taichung.

Jung has led the KBO in triples four times (2011, 2013, 2015, 2020). He was the Most Valuable Player of the 2015 Korean Series.

Notable international careers

External links 

 Career statistics and player information from the KBO official website

1990 births
Living people
Doosan Bears players
KBO League center fielders
South Korean baseball players
Korean Series MVPs
KBO League outfielders